Highway 35, the North Francois Highway, is a 23 km (14 mi) long minor spur of the Yellowhead Highway in the Regional District of Bulkley-Nechako. First opened in 1973, Highway 35 provides a connection from the Yellowhead at the community of Burns Lake, south to Francois Lake, where a ferry connects the highway to the hamlet of Southbank.

References

035